Proboscis extension reflex (PER) is the extension by an insect with an extendable proboscis (e.g. a bee or fly) of her proboscis (sticking out of her tongue) as a reflex to antennal stimulation. It is evoked when a sugar solution is touched to a bee's antenna.

Use of PER 
The proboscis extension reflex is part of an insect's feeding behavior. When the antenna is stimulated by sugar water, the proboscis automatically sticks out to drink. This reflex response can be used to study insect learning and memory in the context of foraging. The PER paradigm is most commonly used in associative learning experiments in honeybees and bumblebees because it is easy to use for simple Pavlovian conditioning.

How the PER learning paradigm works 
There are two steps in a PER experiment. The first step trains the individual to associate a conditioned stimulus (CS), such as an odor with an unconditioned stimulus (US) such as a sugar.  For example, the bee is presented with an odor (CS) and an application of the sugar (US) solution to its antennae, upon which she reflexively extends her proboscis. In some variations, the bee is immediately fed with sugar at this point; this constitutes an operant reinforcement which would tend to establish the odor as a discriminative stimulus. After some number of pairings of the CS and US, the second step in the PER paradigm tests whether or not the association has been learned. The odor (CS) is presented to the bee in the absence of the sugar solution (US), and the association is confirmed if the bee extends her proboscis to this CS alone.

PER in honeybees 
The PER paradigm has been successfully used to investigate olfactory learning in honeybees. It was first introduced by Kimihisa Takeda in 1961. Experiments by Bitterman used first-order classical conditioning to associate an odor with a sugar reward. Individual bees were placed in a tube with their head sticking out. Then a stream of odorant blown towards the bee's head was immediately followed by touching the antenna with a sugar droplet. After only three such trials, the odor alone caused the bee to extend its proboscis approximately 90% of the time. Bees also showed second-order conditioning, learning to associate a second odor with the original odor. The PER paradigm has also been used in honeybees to study motion learning, thermal learning, color learning, habituation, and reversal learning. Abramson et al 2004 use this technique to investigate their sensation of and response to tebufenozide and diflubenzuron.

PER in bumblebees 
Although the majority of PER studies are performed on honeybees, there is at least one successful study of using PER on bumblebees. After they were exposed to a conditioning procedure like that used with honeybees (see above) they gave a conditioned PER response to odor alone PER response 85% of the time after 10 trials.

PER and learning laterality 
Recently, interesting findings in PER studies show laterality in olfactory learning in the two antennae i.e., one antenna is better at associative learning than the other antenna. In honeybees, individuals had either their right or their left antenna covered with a silicone sleeve, leaving the other antenna exposed. The bees that had their right antenna exposed were better at associating an odor with a food reward than bees that had their left antenna exposed. The same study also found that the right antenna has more olfactory receptors than the left antenna, a possible cause for this lateralized PER learning. However, other causes such as internal differences in the actual olfactory pathway or the central nervous system must not be ruled out just yet.

See also
 Bee learning and communication
 Animal behavior

References

External links
 Video of PER on a honeybee
 Picture diagram of PER on a honeybee
 Picture of a honeybee sticking out her proboscis
 Article on using PER in detecting illicit drugs and explosives 

Reflexes
Bees
Beekeeping